Abacus Property Group is a ASX 200 public listed company that specialises in investing in Australian Real estate investment trusts with an investment portfolio concentrated in the Office and Self Storage sectors.  They manage legacy investments in property developments.

History
Abacus was established in 1996 by an academic from the University of British Columbia, Dr Frank Wolf, listing on the Australian Securities Exchange in November 2002.

Operations

It has a single corporate office in Sydney, Australia. The current chair is the South-African born, Myra Salkinder. The CEO Steven Sewell was appointed in 2018 after leaving Vicinity Centres.

The group's investment portfolio is divided into four divisions: office spaces, self-storage facilities, retail shopping centres and industrial properties. It also owns some historically notable buildings, such as the late art-deco Minerva Theatre near Kings Cross in Sydney.

The group's asset portfolio is heavily weighted to office towers, such as 201 Elizabeth Street in Sydney, the Brisbane Club and Westpac House in Adelaide. Its first major investment success was purchasing the heritage listed CBC building at 343 George Street, Sydney for $55 million and sold it the next year for $78 million. As of 2021, the group is considered to be highly exposed to downturn in office spaces since the COVID-19 pandemic led to fewer office workers working from their office.

While the group primarily invests in commercial property assets, such as office towers most of its recent growth has been in self-storage units, a sector buoyed by the storage needs of Australia's growing e-commerce industry. In 2020, Abacus acquired Storage King Pty Ltd, buying the remaining $50m of shares. In early 2021 it purchased a further four self storage facilities in Adelaide and Sydney, along with the remaining 60% of the Oasis Centre in Queensland.

In 2019, the group began divesting from the residential property sector.

References

External links 
 

Companies based in Sydney
Companies listed on the Australian Securities Exchange
Australian brands